Frederic Aspiras is a Vietnamese-Filipino-American wigmaker and hairstylist. He was nominated for an Academy Award in the category Best Makeup and Hairstyling for the film House of Gucci.

Selected filmography 
 House of Gucci (2021; co-nominated with Göran Lundström and Anna Carin Lock)
 A Star Is Born (2018)
 American Horror Story: Hotel (2015–2016)

References

External links 

Joico

Living people
Year of birth missing (living people)
Place of birth missing (living people)
Hairdressers
American LGBT artists